Gerry Britt (23 October 1902 – 22 January 1978) was an  Australian rules footballer who played with North Melbourne in the Victorian Football League (VFL). Britt had earlier played for North in the Victorian Football Association (VFA) before crossing to Williamstown in 1924 where he played in the VFA grand final that year against Footscray at Arden Street. Although he crossed back to North in July of 1925, Britt still ran third in the VFA Recorder Cup of that season. He returned to Williamstown in 1929 and was awarded the most unselfish player trophy in 1930. Britt went to Auburn as captain-coach in 1931. He played a total of 63 games with the VFA Seagulls, kicking 26 goals.

Notes

External links 

1902 births
1978 deaths
Australian rules footballers from Victoria (Australia)
North Melbourne Football Club players
Williamstown Football Club players